William W. Billson (June 7, 1847 – September 2, 1923) was an American lawyer and politician.

Billson was born in Springfield, Illinois. He moved to Duluth, Minnesota in 1865 and practiced law in Duluth. Billson lived in Duluth with his wife and family. He served in the Minnesota Senate in 1872 and from 1883 to 1886. Billson also served as the United States Attorney for the District of Minnesota from 1873 to 1882. He died in Long Beach, California.

References

1847 births
1923 deaths
Politicians from Duluth, Minnesota
Politicians from Springfield, Illinois
Minnesota lawyers
Minnesota state senators